Honeyman Island is an irregularly shaped, uninhabited island in Nunavut, Canada. It is located in the Qikiqtaaluk Region's side of the Gulf of Boothia within Committee Bay. It is west of the mainland's Melville Peninsula.

References

Islands of the Gulf of Boothia
Uninhabited islands of Qikiqtaaluk Region